Deliverr is an E-commerce fulfillment company based in the United States of America. They integrate with eCommerce marketplaces, such as Walmart, eBay, Amazon, Shopify, Wish, and BigCommerce, offering two-day shipping to merchants selling on Walmart's online marketplace, and similar service with other online marketplaces.

Deliverr was co-founded in 2017 by former Symphony Commerce colleagues Harish Abbott and Michael Krakaris, the latter of whom made the Forbes 30 under 30 list in 2019. They have raised multiple rounds of funding totaling $490.9 million in capital. Their Series F funding round, led by Tiger Global, valued the company at $2 billion post-money.

On May 5, 2022, Deliverr was acquired by Shopify for US$2.1 billion in cash and stock.

References

External links 

E-commerce in the United States
2022 mergers and acquisitions